Paolo Sirena (born September 11, 1945 in Treviso) is an Italian former professional footballer who played as a defender.

He played for 10 seasons (216 games, 12 goals) in Serie A for Roma and Verona.

His most memorable goal for Verona fans was a header in the 5-3 win over A.C. Milan on May 20, 1973.

His younger brother Alessandro Sirena also played football professionally. To distinguish them, Paolo was referred to as Sirena I and Alessandro as Sirena II.

After retirement he worked as a lawyer.

Honours
 Coppa Italia winner: 1968/69.

References

1945 births
Living people
Sportspeople from Treviso
Italian footballers
Association football defenders
Serie A players
Treviso F.B.C. 1993 players
A.S. Roma players
Hellas Verona F.C. players
Footballers from Veneto